Leonor, Princess of Asturias (Leonor de Todos los Santos de Borbón y Ortiz; born 31 October 2005) is the heir presumptive to the throne of Spain as the elder daughter of King Felipe VI and Queen Letizia.

In addition to the official title of Princess of Asturias, Leonor bears the historical titles of Princess of Girona, Princess of Viana, Duchess of Montblanc, Countess of Cervera and Lady of Balaguer. If Leonor ascends to the throne as expected, she will be Spain's first queen regnant since her ancestor Isabella II, who reigned from 1833 to 1868.

Birth
Leonor was born to Felipe and Letizia, then the prince and princess of Asturias, on 31 October 2005 at 01:46, during the reign of her paternal grandfather, King Juan Carlos I, in the Ruber International Hospital in Madrid by means of a caesarean section necessitated by non-progression of labour. As the daughter of the heir apparent, she was an infanta and the second in the line of succession to the Spanish throne. Her birth was announced by the royal family to the press via SMS.

Leonor left the Ruber International Hospital with her parents on 7 November 2005. She was baptised in the Zarzuela Palace by the archbishop of Madrid, Cardinal Antonio Rouco Varela, on 14 January 2006.  Like her father, Leonor was baptized – with water from the Jordan River – in a romanesque baptismal font that has been used to christen Spanish princes since the 17th century.

Her godparents were her paternal grandparents, King Juan Carlos I and Queen Sofía. She received the name of Leonor de Todos los Santos.

Education and activities
Leonor's education began at Escuela Infantil Guardia Real, the daycare for the children of the Spanish Royal Guard. She began her first year of primary school on 15 September 2008 at the Santa María de los Rosales School in Aravaca, just outside Madrid. Her father is an alumnus of the private school and her younger sister, Sofía, is also enrolled there. Leonor is fluent in both Spanish and English (the latter learnt from her British nanny and also from her grandmother, Queen Sofía) and has studied Mandarin.

In May 2014, Leonor made her first official visit to the San Javier Air Force base in Murcia.

On 18 June 2014, King Juan Carlos signed the instrument of abdication, and the following day at the stroke of midnight (18–19 June 2014) Leonor's father ascended the throne becoming King Felipe VI, and Leonor became his heir presumptive and Princess of Asturias.

According to the Spanish constitution of 1975, the succession to the Spanish throne is under a system of male-preference cognatic primogeniture, meaning that Leonor, as the elder of Felipe's two daughters, is first in line to inherit the throne. Under the current law, however, if her father has a legitimate son while still being king, Leonor would be displaced in the line of succession and again become an Infanta of Spain. There have been discussions about changing the succession law to absolute primogeniture, allowing for the inheritance of the eldest child, regardless of sex; however, the birth of Leonor, followed by that of her younger sister Sofía, stalled these plans. Despite a change from male-preference to absolute primogeniture for Spanish titles of nobility in 2009, as of  no legislation has been passed affecting the succession to the throne.

In October 2014, a wax figure of Leonor was unveiled at the Museo de Cera in Madrid. On 20 May 2015, Leonor received First Communion as per Catholic custom.

A day before her 10th birthday, she was granted the Order of the Golden Fleece by her father. In addition, the Council of Ministers approved the design of her personal standard and guidon. Coinciding with the 50th birthday of King Felipe, in January 2018, the King officially gave Leonor the collar of the Golden Fleece in a ceremony at the Royal Palace of Madrid.

In September 2018, Leonor conducted her first public engagement outside the palace by accompanying her parents to Covadonga to celebrate the 1,300th anniversary of the Kingdom of Asturias. On 31 October 2018, Princess Leonor gave her first public speech, held at the Instituto Cervantes in Madrid, where she read the first article of the Constitution of Spain. The speech coincided with the 40th anniversary of the constitution and her 13th birthday.

On 18 October 2019, she made her first significant speech at Premio Princesa de Asturias. On 4 November 2019, she made her first speech at the Princess of Girona Foundation awards in Barcelona, in which she spoke in Spanish, Catalan, English and Arabic.

On 10 February 2021, it was announced that in the autumn of 2021 she would continue her secondary education at the United World College of the Atlantic in Wales, studying the 2-year IB Diploma Programme. She carried out her first public solo engagement on March 24, 2021 by attending a ceremony to mark the 30th anniversary of the Instituto Cervantes.

Titles, styles, honours and arms

Leonor was initially styled "Her Royal Highness Infanta Leonor of Spain". Upon her father's accession to the throne, she became known as "Her Royal Highness The Princess of Asturias" as heir presumptive. She also holds the titles Princess of Girona, Princess of Viana, Duchess of Montblanc, Countess of Cervera and Lady of Balaguer.

Honours
As heir presumptive to the throne, she is the nominal chairwoman of the Princess of Asturias Foundation and the Princess of Girona Foundation, although until she becomes 18, those functions are assumed by her father.

Also as traditional for the heir to the throne, her father awarded her the medal and collar of the Order of the Golden Fleece (awarded 30 October 2015, presented 30 January 2018).

Arms

See also

Princess of Asturias Awards
Politics of Spain

Notes

References

External links

Official website

2005 births
Living people
Daughters of kings
Nobility from Madrid
Spanish infantas
Spanish princesses
Princes of Asturias
Felipe VI of Spain
House of Bourbon (Spain)
Knights of the Golden Fleece of Spain
Spanish people of Greek descent
People educated at Atlantic College
Heirs presumptive